In Hittite mythology, Ḫalmašuit (Hattic: Hanwasuit) was the  "throne-goddess" of the kings. The Hittites believed that the kings derived their right to rule from Ḫalmašuit.

See also

 Hittite mythology

Hittite deities